Carbonell Condominium is a residential high-rise building located in the Brickell neighborhood of Miami, Florida. The tower is one of the tallest buildings located on Brickell Key, a small island located due east of Brickell at the mouth of the Miami River in Biscayne Bay. The building's address is 901 Brickell Key Boulevard. Carbonell Condominium houses 40 floors, and was completed in 2005.

See also
List of tallest buildings in Miami

External links 
Carbonell Condominium on SkyscraperPage

Buildings and structures completed in 2005
Residential skyscrapers in Miami
Residential condominiums in the United States
2005 establishments in Florida